Pulsarella fultoni is a species of sea snail, a marine gastropod mollusk in the family Borsoniidae.

Description
The length of the shell varies between 20 mm and 30 mm. The elongate shell has a sharp spire. It has a pale grey color with dark, longitudinal, irregularly scattered strigae, tinted on both sides in a dark color. The shell contains 11 whorls. The sutures are hardly impressed. The body whorl is slightly convex with 7 - 8 carinae. The small aperture is elongate-oval. The outer lip is deeply sinuated. The siphonal canal is very short.

Distribution
This marine species occurs off False Bay, South Transkei and the Agulhas Bank, . South Africa

References

 G.B. Sowerby III, Journal. of Conchology, vol. vi. 1889.
  G.B. Sowerby III (1892) Marine shells of South Africa - a catalogue of all the known species

External links
 

fultoni
Gastropods described in 1888